"Inventing Myself" is a single by recording artist Stan Walker from his fourth studio album Inventing Myself.

Background and composition
"Inventing Myself" is a R&B ballad with funk-influenced horns. It was released as a single via music download by Sony Music Australia on 9 July 2013 in New Zealand.

Reception
"Inventing Myself" debuted on the New Zealand Singles Chart at number 27 on 22 July 2013, but fell off the chart the next week.

Chart performance

References

Stan Walker songs
2013 songs
2013 singles